In July 2022, an outbreak of gang violence occurred in the Haitian capital of Port-au-Prince, leaving 89 people dead and over 74 injured.

Background
Since the late 2010's Haiti has suffered a growing epidemic of gang violence and gang-related activity, especially in the capital of Port-au-Prince. The gang violence grew especially after the assassination of Haitian president Jovenel Moise in July 2021. One of the most notable gang leaders in the conflict is Jimmy Chérizier, also known as "Barbecue", who leads the group G9. Barbecue has been known for multiple massacres in the Port-au-Prince area, along with G9 allying with the Haitian government. The 2022 battles began after tensions erupted between G9 and a new rival gang, G-pep. This uptick in gang violence also comes at a time when Haiti faces severe food and healthcare shortages.

Battle
Just a day after the one-year anniversary of Moise's assassination on July 7, at 3AM gunfire rang out in the Brooklyn neighborhood of the Cité Soleil slum between G9 and G-Pèp gang members. According to a Brooklyn resident, "all the roads [were] blocked inside [the neighborhood]; there is nowhere to go". Some Haitian police officers were present at the scene, but most were not due to not having received their salaries for a month combined with a shortage of fuel for their cars. Initially, deputy mayor Jean Hislain Frederick stated that 50 were killed in the violence and over 50 injured, but that number has since increased, according to the National Human Rights Defense Network.

Doctors Without Borders has stated that the organization has been unable to access the slum due to the violence. The battle also caused the nearby Varreux field terminal to pause operations, leading to a more drastic shortage in fuel as two fuel tankers were unable to be unloaded.

References

2018–2023 Haitian crisis
Port-au-Prince
Port-au-Prince
Port-au-Prince
Port-au-Prince
Gang battles